Wyoming Highway 11 (WYO 11) is  Wyoming state highway known as Albany Road in southwestern Albany County, that provides access to Albany from Wyoming Highway 130.

Route description

Major intersections

References

 Official 2003 State Highway Map of Wyoming
 WYO 11 - WYO 130 to Albany

Transportation in Albany County, Wyoming
011